Leptalestes is an extinct genus of mammals in the infraclass Metatheria. It was described by B.M. Davis in 2007. A new species, L. toevsi, was described from the late Cretaceous period of the United States by John P. Hunter, Ronald E. Heinrich, and David B. Weishampel in 2010.

Species
 Leptalestes cooki (Clemens 1966)
 Leptalestes prokrejcii (Fox 1979)
 Leptalestes krejcii (Clemens 1966)
 Leptalestes toevsi Hunter et al. 2010

References

External links
 Leptalestes at the Paleobiology Database

Prehistoric metatherians
Cretaceous mammals of North America
Hell Creek fauna
Fossil taxa described in 2007